"The Ghost Talks" is the twenty-first episode of the 1969 ITC British television series Randall and Hopkirk (Deceased) starring Mike Pratt, Kenneth Cope and Annette Andre. The episode was first broadcast on 6 February 1970, on ITV, and was directed by Cyril Frankel.

Synopsis
With Jeff laid up in a hospital bed with one arm and one leg in plaster (having fallen off a balcony whilst trying to apprehend a safe-cracker), Marty visits and seizes the opportunity to tell him about a spy drama that he handled while he was still alive — the details of which he has never previously revealed — involving a corrupt MI5 official and spy ring.

While Jeff was out of town, Marty was hired by Major Brenan, a man pretending to be Sir Basil Dougan, a top MI5 official at a country club to retrieve "stolen" important documents from a perceived unloyal member of the British Secret Service. However, the morning after Marty and his hired Liverpudlian safecracker (who also personally steals a diamond necklace) successfully locate the documents, it turns out to be an actual theft from the real important member of MI5. Marty, in disgust, tries to hunt down the imposter Major Brenan and eventually locates him in the sauna of the country club where Marty is forced into an overheated sauna with his suit on (underneath the robes) to attempt to avoid capture from the imposter's henchmen.

Despite this, Marty escapes and later overpowers one of the imposter's leading henchman who attempts to kill him in his car. Marty slams on the brakes smashing the henchman's head against the window, later tying him up in his apartment.

Marty tracks down the imposter's registration number and shadows him to the docks where the faulty Sir Basil Dougan plans an escape with the stolen documents aboard a ship to a foreign country. Marty is eventually able to contact the BBC via the ship's radio for the police to round up the perpetrators.

Overview
This the only episode in the entire series where the main story is based on a past event.

Cast
John Boxer ...  Dr. Musgrove
Ian Butler ...  Page Boy
Martin Carroll ...  Groves
Peter Cellier ...  Long
John Collin ...  Jackson
James Culliford...  Parker
Thomas Heathcote ...  Chief Inspector Horner
Geoffrey King ...  Sir Basil Duggan
Jack Lambert ...  2nd Man in Steamroom
Jack MacGowran ...  Joe Hudson
Alan MacNaughtan ...  Major Brenan
Marne Maitland...  Captain Rashid
Hilary Wontner ...  1st Man in Steamroom

Video and DVD release
The episode was released on VHS and several times on DVD with differing special features.

External links
https://web.archive.org/web/20070206224216/http://www.anorakzone.com/randall/old/index.html

Randall and Hopkirk (Deceased) episodes
1970 British television episodes